Andrew Collins (born 25 April 1965) is an Australian rules football coach and former player who is currently the head of development coach for the Hawthorn Football Club. He played for the Hawthorn Football Club in the Victorian/Australian Football League.

Collins was a rugged back pocket defender. He began his senior career in the Victorian Football Association with the Sandringham Football Club, where he was a member of the club's 1985 premiership team. He was signed by VFL/AFL club , and played 212 games over ten years with the club, winning three premierships. His durability allowed him to play a club record 189 games in succession. He finished equal fifth in the 1990 Brownlow Medal, the same year he was awarded the Peter Crimmins Medal as Hawthorn's best and fairest player. His last game was the "Merger game" between Hawthorn and Melbourne in 1996 in which he got reported and ultimately suspended thus ending his consecutive run of games.

When Collins retired from league football at the end of 1996, he turned to coaching. He returned to his old club Sandringham in the VFL, and coached there for two years, leading the club to the premiership in 1997. He served as an assistant coach at AFL club  from 2000 to 2003, then as an assistant coach at Hawthorn in 2004 and 2005. While at Hawthorn, he also coached its  Box Hill. In 2006 and 2007 he coached VFL club Coburg, taking the team to a losing Grand Final in 2007.

In 2008, Collins moved to South Australia and coached South Australian National Football League club West Adelaide for six years from 2008 to 2013. He led the club to the 2012 SANFL Grand Final where they were defeated by Norwood, and he coached the Bloods to win the 2013 Foxtel Cup over Western Australian Football League (WAFL) side East Fremantle.

In 2014, Collins returned to Victoria and signed to coach VFL club Williamstown in its first season as a stand-alone club not affiliated with an AFL club. He led the club to a premiership in 2015. Collins would lead the club to another Grand Final in 2019 where Williamston would lose by 3 points. The following year, Collins would depart the club to join Box Hill as an assistant coach. Following the 2021 season, Collins would be appointed as the head of development with Hawthorn under new coach Sam Mitchell who he had worked with at Box Hill.

Statistics

|-
|scope="row"|1987||||40
|8||1||3||71||56||127||16||15||0.1||0.4||8.9||7.0||15.9||2.0||1.9||0
|-
|scope="row"bgcolor="F0E68C"|1988#||||40
|21||8||3||180||122||302||45||46||0.4||0.1||8.6||5.8||14.4||2.1||2.2||0
|-
|scope="row"bgcolor="F0E68C"|1989#||||4
|24||4||1||250||138||388||50||63||0.2||0.0||10.4||5.8||16.2||2.1||2.6||9
|-
|scope="row"|1990||||4
|23||5||1||273||120||393||81||54||0.2||0.0||11.9||5.2||17.1||3.5||2.3||15
|-
|scope="row"bgcolor="F0E68C"|1991#||||4
|25||6||8||227||133||360||54||59||0.2||0.3||9.1||5.3||14.4||2.2||2.4||4
|-
|scope="row"|1992||||4
|23||6||5||241||128||369||86||48||0.3||0.2||10.5||5.6||16.0||3.7||2.1||3
|-
|scope="row"|1993||||5
|21||3||4||208||104||312||65||62||0.1||0.2||9.9||5.0||14.9||3.1||3.0||0
|-
|scope="row"|1994||||5
|23||0||0||182||126||308||60||56||0.0||0.0||7.9||5.5||13.4||2.6||2.4||1
|-
|scope="row"|1995||||5
|22||1||1||189||98||287||41||49||0.0||0.0||8.6||4.5||13.0||1.9||2.2||1
|-
|scope="row"|1996||||5
|22||3||1||157||102||259||35||55||0.1||0.0||7.1||4.6||11.8||1.6||2.5||0
|- class="sortbottom"
!colspan=3|Career
!212!!37!!27!!1978!!1127!!3105!!533!!507!!0.2!!0.1!!9.3!!5.3!!14.6!!2.5!!2.4!!33
|}

Honours and achievements

Playing
Team
 3× VFL/AFL premiership player: 1988, 1989, 1991
 2× Minor premiership: 1988, 1989

Individual
 Peter Crimmins Memorial Medal: 1990
 4× Victoria Australian rules football team: 1990, 1991, 1992, 1994

Coaching
 VFL premiership coach: 1997
 VFL premiership coach: 2015

References

External links

Australian rules footballers from Victoria (Australia)
1965 births
Living people
Hawthorn Football Club players
Hawthorn Football Club Premiership players
Sandringham Football Club players
Box Hill Football Club coaches
Coburg Football Club coaches
West Adelaide Football Club coaches
Sandringham Football Club coaches
Williamstown Football Club coaches
Peter Crimmins Medal winners
Victorian State of Origin players
Three-time VFL/AFL Premiership players